The 2016 Caribbean Premier League (CPLT20) or for sponsorship reasons, Hero CPL 2016 was the fourth season of the Caribbean Premier League, the domestic Twenty20 cricket league in the West Indies. The league began on 29 June and ended on 7 August. Matches were played in seven countries – Trinidad and Tobago, Saint Kitts and Nevis, Guyana, Barbados, Jamaica, Saint Lucia, and the United States. The United States have hosted fixtures for the first time, with six matches played at the Central Broward Regional Park in Lauderhill, Florida. The competition's finals was played at Warner Park, Basseterre, St.Kitts and Nevis.

Squads

Teams and standings

 Top four teams will advance to the Playoffs
  advanced to the Qualifier 1
  advanced to the Qualifier 2

League progression

Fixtures

Knockout stage

Bracket

Qualifier 1

Eliminator

Qualifier 2

Final

Statistics

Most runs

 Last Update: 7 August 2016.
  The player with the most runs at the end of the tournament receives the Orange Cap.
 Source: Cricinfo

Most wickets

 Last Update: 7 August 2016.
  The player with the most wickets at the end of the tournament receives the Purple Cap.
 Source: Cricinfo
 The player of the series Andre Russell in 11 games for The (Jamaica Tallawahs) made 286 runs (average  31.77, strike rate 172.28) and took 11 wickets (average 19.27, RPO 8.42).

References

External links
 Official web site
 Series home on ESPNCricinfo

Caribbean Premier League
Caribbean Premier League
Caribbean Premier League
2016 in American cricket